The Steele Dunning Historic District is a neighborhood and historic district in Bloomington, Indiana, United States.  Composed of small, single- or double-family houses, the district includes houses built from the late nineteenth century through the middle of the twentieth century.

Construction
Steele Dunning is located on Bloomington's west side, north of the older Prospect Hill neighborhood.  In the earliest years of white settlement of Bloomington, the land presently occupied by the neighborhood was part of a farm once owned by Paris C. Dunning, once Governor of Indiana. Dunning's house, known as the Blair-Dunning House, sits immediately southeast of Steele Dunning; among its owners after Dunning was Henry Steele, who bought the land in 1931.  At this time, Bloomington was prospering greatly, and Steele chose to subdivide  of his land to create a neighborhood.  The resulting community is located primarily along the east-west Third and Fourth Streets and the north-south Fairview and Jackson Streets.

Architecture
The neighborhood that resulted from Steele's subdivision consists almost entirely of single-story houses, most of which were built in a "Free Classic" style that resembles the Queen Anne style of architecture.  Some of the houses in the neighborhood are older than the neighborhood itself, such as three different double-pen houses that were constructed during the nineteenth century. Two of the houses are duplexes; erected largely for speculative purposes, they were constructed in such a way that they resemble single-family houses.  The form of architecture employed for these residences is known as the "T-plan" because of their floor plan that is shaped like that letter; they feature porches on both sides that are separated by a large gable with a pediment.

Despite the small size of the neighborhood, its houses were built at different times; some were built in the late nineteenth century, including one from 1880, while others are as late as 1950.  In addition, there are eight non-contributing buildings (seven houses and a church building); built at various dates as late as 1962, they are located within the boundaries of the historic district, but are not parts of it.  The majority of the properties in the district were constructed in the early twentieth century; most houses on Fourth Street were constructed between 1900 and 1910, and the houses on Third Street were erected in the second quarter of the century.  As a result of the different construction dates, the architectural styles of the two streets are different: Fourth Street primarily features the Free Classic style, while most Third Street residences are in the Arts and Crafts style.  Among the most historically significant of the houses are the duplexes on Fourth Street (among the city's first duplexes), the house at 608 Fourth Street that was once home to Bloomington mayor John Hetherington, and the "saddlebag" house at 521 Fourth Street, which was built in 1898.  Two Sears Modern Homes and one shotgun house are also found in the district.

Historic assessment

Twenty-five buildings within the district's boundaries qualified as contributing properties — they help to make the district historic.  Between 1999 and 2001, historic preservation officials working with the city of Bloomington surveyed the entire city and identified over two thousand buildings that were deemed to be historic to one extent or another, including the twenty-five in Steele Dunning.  These buildings were divided into three classifications: Outstanding, Notable, and Contributing.  Properties rated as "Outstanding" were deemed to be historically significant enough to deserve consideration for inclusion on the National Register of Historic Places by themselves; "Notable" properties were worthy of special consideration, although not likely to be worthy of individual National Register status; "Contributing" locations were seen as significant parts of their historic districts, but not of great significance by themselves.  One of Steele Dunning's contributing properties (the "saddlebag" house) received an "Outstanding" rating, and nine were deemed "Notable;" only fifteen were called "Contributing."  The district includes a disproportionately large number of above-average properties: about 13% of the city's sites were named either "Notable" or "Outstanding," in contrast to 40% of those in Steele Dunning.  In late 2000, the entire district was listed on the National Register, qualifying both because of its place in the region's history and because of its historically significant architecture.  Like the city-designated district, the federally designated district includes twenty-five buildings; however, it also includes two structures, which were not included in the city's designation.

Table of contributing buildings

References

Buildings and structures in Bloomington, Indiana
Bungalow architecture in Indiana
Houses on the National Register of Historic Places in Indiana
Neighborhoods in Indiana
Queen Anne architecture in Indiana
Houses in Monroe County, Indiana
Historic districts on the National Register of Historic Places in Indiana
Historic districts in Monroe County, Indiana
National Register of Historic Places in Monroe County, Indiana